The 1964–65 North Carolina Tar Heels men's basketball team represented the University of North Carolina at Chapel Hill during the 1964–65 men's college basketball season.

Roster
Billy Cunningham
Bobby Lewis
Ray Respess
Tom Gauntlett
Ian Morrison
John Yonkley
Bob Bennett
Mark Mirken
Bill Brown
Ray Hassell
Pud Hassell
Mike Smith
Jim Smithwick

Schedule

December 7 - Bobby Lewis scores 23 and Billy Cunningham adds 22 in the win over Kentucky, Dean Smith's first win over a ranked team.
Following the loss to Wake Forest on January 6, the team bus returned home to find Dean Smith hung in effigy.
The final home game against Duke was the last game played at Woollen Gymnasium and Billy Cunningham's final home game.

Statistics
Scoring: Billy Cunningham 25.4 ppg
Rebounding: Billy Cunningham 14.3 rpg

References

North Carolina Tar Heels men's basketball seasons
North Carolina
Tar
Tar